The 1983–84 season was the 85th season for FC Barcelona.

Squad

Non-competitive

Pre-season

Friendlies

10-08-1983 FRIENDLY ANDERLECHT-BARCELONA 1-1

17-08-1983 Trofeo Costa Blanca HERCULES-BARCELONA 1-3

22-08-1983 Joan Gamper Trophy BARCELONA-NOTTINGHAM FOREST 2-0

28-08-1983 Centenary of Bordeaux NANTES BARCELONA 2-3

Mid-season

Friendlies
08-12-1983 FRIENDLY HOSPITALET-BARCELONA 2-5

20-12-1983 FRIENDLY SANT ANDREU-BARCELONA 1-2

Post-season
08-05-1984 FRIENDLY UDINESE-BARCELONA 4-1

26-06-1984 FRIENDLY MARTINENC-BARCELONA 3-7

Competitions

Overall

Supercopa de España

Primera División

League table

Results summary

Results by matchday

Matches

Copa del Rey

25-01-1984 Copa del Rey HERCULES-BARCELONA 2-1

08-02-1984 Copa del Rey BARCELONA-HERCULES 3-0

22-02-1984 Copa del Rey BARCELONA-OSASUNA 4-0

14-03-1984 Copa del Rey OSASUNA-BARCELONA 3-2

04-04-1984 Copa del Rey BARCELONA-LAS PALMAS 2-1

18-04-1984 Copa del Rey LAS PALMAS-BARCELONA 1-0 /2-4/ PENALTY

Copa de la Liga

19-05-1984 Copa de la Liga BARCELONA-R.SOCIEDAD 3-0

27-05-1984 Copa de la Liga R.SOCIEDAD-BARCELONA 2-0

03-06-1984 Copa de la Liga MALLORCA-BARCELONA 2-1

09-06-1984 Copa de la Liga BARCELONA-MALLORCA 3-2 /5-4/ PENALS

16-06-1984 Copa de la Liga BARCELONA-AT.MADRID 1-2

21-06-1984 Copa de la Liga AT.MADRID-BARCELONA 2-1

Cup Winners' Cup

First round

Second round

Quarter-finals

External links

webdelcule.com

FC Barcelona seasons
Barcelona